Terenure, originally called Roundtown, is an affluent, middle class suburb of Dublin in Ireland. It is located in the city's D6W postcode area.

Location and transport
Terenure lies primarily in the administrative area of Dublin City Council but with parts falling in South Dublin. It is located south of Harold's Cross and north of Rathfarnham, and also borders the suburbs of Templeogue, Rathgar, Kimmage and Perrystown.

Terenure Cross (Vaughan's Corner) was at one time a terminus for the Dublin tramways, and is mentioned in James Joyce's novel Ulysses (Episode 7, 'Aeolus'). There were three tram depots in Terenure at one time, the main tram depot for the number 15 Dublin United Transport Company (DUTC) trams on Terenure Road East, another DUTC depot for number 16 trams on Rathfarnham Road, and the terminus of the Dublin and Blessington Steam Tramway on Templeogue Road. The modern tram system — the Luas — does not serve Terenure, but it is still served by bus routes numbered 15, 15a and 16 bus, among others. The bus route numbers were originally allocated based on historic tram route numbers.

History

Terenure, Drimnagh and Kimmage, then well to the south of the city of Dublin, were granted to the Barnewell family by King John in 1215. The Barnewells gave some of the land to St John The Baptist Hospital outside Newgate, and Cromwell confiscated the remainder from them. Following this Terenure passed through the hands of various owners, including what is now Terenure College (bought by the Carmelites in 1860). In the seventeenth century, the main landowners were the Deane family, whose most notable member was Joseph Deane, Chief Baron of the Irish Exchequer; his estates later passed to the Bourne family. Fortfield House was built around 1785 by a later Chief Baron, Barry Yelverton, 1st Viscount Avonmore. It was later owned by John Hatchell, the Attorney General for Ireland and passed by inheritance to the Perrin family. It was demolished in 1934.

The earliest reference to these areas can be found in a grant (ref Grant CCA-DCc-ChAnt/C/1206) stored in the Canterbury Cathedral Archives, by which King Henry II granted the lands Terenure and Kimmage (Cheming) in Rathfarnham to Walter the goldsmith ('aurifauber') in 1175. It has not yet been established how the lands reverted to the crown within 40 years.

On 2 January 1941, during World War II, the German Luftwaffe bombed Terenure, injuring seven people and destroying two houses.

Education 
Schools within the Terenure area include St. Joseph's BNS, Presentation Primary School, Presentation College (was Presentation secondary school; renamed in 2004), Terenure College and Our Lady's Secondary school.

Religion
The Catholic parish church of St. Joseph in Terenure is an impressive edifice with a stained glass window by Harry Clarke. St. Joseph's school is on the church grounds.

Along with Rathgar and the area around Portobello, Terenure has traditionally been the home of many of Dublin's Jewish population. Terenure Synagogue, Dublin's main synagogue (Orthodox) is on Rathfarnham Road.

People

The author James Joyce, who was born nearby at 41 Brighton Square in Rathgar on 2 February 1882, was baptised at St. Joseph's church on 5 February by Rev. John O'Mulloy. His mother, Mary Jane (May) Murray, was born 90 metres from the church at Terenure Cross in 1859 in the pub owned by her father, John Murray, called The Eagle House.

The village was home to actors, writers and musicians including the artist Mary Perrin, who grew up in Fortfield House, Donal McCann and Máirtín Ó Direáin. Broadcaster Mike Murphy, Derek Daly former Formula One driver, comedian Dave Allen, Olympic boxer Mick Dowling, musicians Republic of Loose, Rob Smith, The Coronas and Grammy-winner Susan McKeown all hail from Terenure.

Sport
Terenure is the home of Terenure College RFC, a senior rugby club in Division 1A of the AIB All Ireland League.

Terenure Rangers Football Club provide schoolboy, schoolgirl and adult football for men and women to the surrounding area.

Terenure Sports Club is also in Terenure.

See also
 List of towns and villages in Ireland
 Terenure in Old Photographs (2014), by Joe Curtis

Notes

References

External links

Terenure College website
Terenure College RFC website
St. Joseph's BNS website
Terenure Rangers Football Club website
Our Lady's Secondary School

 
Towns and villages in Dublin (city)
Towns and villages in South Dublin (county)